HMS Londonderry was a Rothesay- or Type 12-class anti-submarine frigate of the British Royal Navy in service from 1960 to 1984.

Design
The Rothesay-class was an improved version of the Whitby-class anti-submarine frigate, with nine Rothesays ordered in the 1954–55 shipbuilding programme for the Royal Navy to supplement the six Whitbys.

The Rothesays were powered by the same Y-100 machinery used by the Whitby class. Crew was about 212 officers and men.

A twin 4.5-inch (113 mm) Mark 6 gun mount was fitted forward, with 350 rounds of ammunition carried. It was originally intended to fit a twin 40 mm L/70 Bofors anti-aircraft mount aft, but in 1957 it was decided to fit the Seacat anti-aircraft missile instead. Seacat was not yet ready, and Londonderry was completed with a single Bofors 40 mm Automatic Gun L/60 mount aft as a temporary anti-aircraft armament. The design anti-submarine armament consisted of twelve 21-inch torpedo-tubes (eight fixed and two twin rotating mounts) for Mark 20E Bidder homing anti-submarine torpedoes, backed up by two Limbo anti-submarine mortars fitted aft. The Bidder homing torpedoes proved unsuccessful however, being too slow to catch modern submarines, and the torpedo tubes were soon removed.

The ship was fitted with a Type 293Q surface/air search radar on the foremast, with a Type 277 height-finding radar on a short mast forward of the foremast. A Mark 6M fire control system (including a Type 275 radar) for the 4.5 inch guns was mounted above the ship's bridge, while a Type 974 navigation radar was also fitted. The ship's sonar fit consisted of Type 174 search, Type 170 fire control sonar for Limbo and a Type 162 sonar for classifying targets on the sea floor.

Construction
Londonderry was laid down at J. Samuel White's Cowes, Isle of Wight, shipyard on 15 November 1956, and was launched by Cynthia Brooke, Viscountess Brookeborough, wife of Basil Brooke, 1st Viscount Brookeborough, the Prime Minister of Northern Ireland, on 20 May 1958. She was completed on 20 July 1960.

Modernisation
From 1967 to 1969 Londonderry underwent a major modernisation, which brought the ship close in capacity to the Leander class. A hangar and flight deck was added aft to allow a Westland Wasp helicopter to be operated, at the expense of one of the Limbo anti-submarine mortars, while a Seacat launcher and the associated GWS20 director was mounted on the hangar roof. Two 20-mm cannons were added either side of the ship's bridge. A MRS3 fire control system replaced the Mark 6M, and its integral Type 903 radar allowed the Type 277 height finder radar to be removed. A Type 993 surface/air-search radar replaced the existing Type 293Q radar, while the ship's defences were enhanced by the addition of the Corvus chaff rocket dispenser.

Fleet service
After commissioning on 20 July 1960, Londonderry completed manufacturer's trials and then was formally taken over by the Royal Navy. She then carried out time in the Home Fleet before departing Portsmouth, Hampshire, UK, on 1 May 1961 for her first cruise in the Caribbean area. Between 1961 and 1964 the frigate was deployed four times to the West Indies, also visiting Argentina. In October 1961 she was diverted to assist the Italian liner  when the latter caught fire in the port of St. George's, Grenada. In August 1965 she was present at Portsmouth Navy Days. On 1 April 1963, Londonderry ferried 17 suspected members of an anti-Castro group who had been arrested by Bahamas Police on a Cay in the Cay Sal Bankss to Nassau, Bahamas. On 31 August 1965 Londonderry left Portsmouth for service in the Far East. She returned in 1967 and was modernised until 1969 at Rosyth. The most distinctive features of her modernization were the helicopter deck and hangar aft for a Westland Wasp helicopter.

Following her modernization she was sent to Malaysia in 1970. She also took part in the Beira Patrol and was then sent to the Bahamas where she rescued 148 Cuban refugees. In 1973 she replaced  in the NATO Standing Naval Force Atlantic.

Trials ship 

In November 1975 she entered the Rosyth Dockyard to be refitted as a trials ship for Admiralty Surface Weapons Establishment. Up to October 1979 Londonderry had her armament removed, and an extra mast added for her new role as a trials ship. The original propellers were replaced and new, low-cavitation propellers were installed. Additional navigational equipment and accommodation were installed to provide berths for both midshipmen from Dartmouth and apprentices from  who were undergoing sea training.

In early 1982, Londonderry accompanied  on a sea training trip to the West Indies and the United States, visiting Virgin Gorda in the British Virgin Islands and New Orleans during the Mardi Gras celebrations. Returning home she was paid off into reserve on 31 March 1982. Originally she should have been put on the disposal list, but due to the Falklands War she became the Dartmouth Training Ship of the 6th Frigate Squadron. From 20 January to 29 March Londonderry made her last cruise from Portsmouth for the Dartmouth Training Squadron's deployment to the West Indies and USA. She then became a Harbour Training Ship attached to the shore base  at Gosport. She remained in this role until 1988. On 25 June 1989 Londonderry was finally sunk as a target off Scotland.

During her service Londonderry steamed approximately 125,500 km, four times crossing the Atlantic and transiting the Panama Canal three times. She visited 50 ports in 35 different countries. Although never deployed in a war the ship's guns fired 1,232 rounds of 4.5-inch ammunition and 442 rounds of 40 mm ammunition.

Notes

References

Publications

External links
 HMS Londonderry veterans' website

 

Rothesay-class frigates
1958 ships